The Wind & the Reckoning is an American Hawaiian Western historical drama film produced and directed by David L. Cunningham. The film is "a story inspired by real-life events" that are known as the Koolau Rebellion in Hawaii, particularly a 1906 Hawaiian-written account by Pi'ilani, the wife of one of its combatants. 

The film was released on 4 November 2022.

Plot 
Set in 1893 on Kauai, after the Hawaiian Kingdom had been overthrown by agents and Hawaii-based citizens of the United States and just as an outbreak of leprosy engulfs the tropical paradise. The new government orders all Native Hawaiians suspected of having the disease banished permanently to a remote colony on the island of Moloka'i that is known as 'the island of the living grave'. When a local cowboy named Ko’olau (Jason Scott Lee) and his young son Kalei (Kahiau Perreira) contract the dreaded disease, they refuse to allow their family to be separated, sparking an armed clash with brutal white island authorities that will make Ko’olau and his wife, Pi’ilani (Lindsay Marie Anuhea Watson) heroes for the ages. The film is based on real-life historical events as told through the memoirs of Pi'ilani published in 1906, titled Ka Moolelo oiaio o Kaluaikoolau ("The True Story of Kaluaikoolau").

Cast

Production 
The film is spoken primarily in Hawaiian and subtitled in English, which makes it one of the first Hawaiian language films with an international distribution. For cultural and linguistic accuracy, Hawaiian cultural experts were called upon: Leinā‘ala Fruean, Kumu Ka’ea Lyons, Kumu Kauhane Heloca and Kumu Na’auao Viva.

The cultural experts helped translate the script by John Fusco into Hawaiian. They worked with the cast to teach them the language, and they were on set giving notes while filming. The cultural experts also ensured the costumes were accurate, using historical photographers for inspiration.

The film was shot on Hawai'i in late 2020. Due to the ongoing COVID-19 pandemic, the film's crew and cast were sequestered on a 50 acre ranch on the island Hawaii.

Release 
The Wind & the Reckoning had its world premiere at the Boston Film Festival on September 24, 2022 where it won Best Film. The film also won the Kumeyaay Award and the Audience Choice Best Feature Film award at the San Diego International Film Festival.

References 

Upcoming films
Films shot in Hawaii
Films based on works by Jack London
Films based on short fiction
Hawaiian-language films

External links 

 Official site

 

2022 Western (genre) films